Zinc finger protein 343 is a protein that in humans is encoded by the ZNF343 gene.

References